Madagascar competed at the 2022 Winter Olympics in Beijing, China, from 4 to 20 February 2022.

The Malagasy team consisted of two athletes (one per gender) competing in alpine skiing. Both athletes carried the Malagasy flag during the opening ceremony. Meanwhile alpine skier Mathieu Neumuller was the flagbearer during the closing ceremony.

Competitors
The following is the list of number of competitors participating at the Games per sport/discipline.

Alpine skiing

By meeting the basic qualification standards, Madagascar qualified one male and one female alpine skier.

See also
Tropical nations at the Winter Olympics

References

External links
Beijing 2022 – Madagascar

Nations at the 2022 Winter Olympics
2022
Winter Olympics